Arpan is an unincorporated community in Butte County, in the U.S. state of South Dakota.

History
Arpan was platted in 1910, and named for a local family. A post office called Arpan was in operation from 1911 until 1940.

Notable people
 Lawrence G. Bernard, U.S. Navy Rear Admiral and World War II submariner

References

Unincorporated communities in Butte County, South Dakota
Unincorporated communities in South Dakota